Robert Elmer Cowell (June 12, 1924 – January 11, 1960) was an American competition swimmer, Olympic medalist, and U.S. Navy officer.  At the 1948 Summer Olympics in London, England, he received a silver medal for his second-place performance in the men's 100-meter backstroke, finishing with a time of 1:06.5 immediately behind fellow American Allen Stack.

Cowell attended the U.S. Naval Academy, where he was a member of the Navy Midshipmen swimming and diving team in National Collegiate Athletic Association (NCAA) competition from 1944 to 1946.  He was a member of Navy's NCAA championship team in the 3x100-yard medley relay in 1944, and won the individual NCAA national championship in the 150-yard backstroke in 1946.  He was also the Amateur Athletic Union (AAU) national champion in the 100-meter outdoor backstroke in 1945 and the 150-yard indoor backstroke in 1947.

After graduating from the Naval Academy, he became a career U.S. Navy officer.  He died in Athens, Georgia in 1960; he was 35 years old.  In his memory, the Naval Academy annually presents the Robert E. Cowell Award to the graduating midshipmen who has shown outstanding swimming ability, leadership and good sportsmanship.

See also
 List of Olympic medalists in swimming (men)
 List of United States Naval Academy alumni

References

External links
 

1924 births
1960 deaths
American male backstroke swimmers
Navy Midshipmen men's swimmers
Olympic silver medalists for the United States in swimming
Sportspeople from Pennsylvania
Swimmers at the 1948 Summer Olympics
United States Navy officers
Medalists at the 1948 Summer Olympics
20th-century American people